Lindsay Diane Bloom is an American actress and former beauty-pageant contestant.

Bloom is a native of Omaha, Nebraska. At age 17, she decided to become an actress and entered beauty pageants to gain attention. She was Miss Omaha in the 1968 preliminaries for the Miss America Pageant. She did not advance to the national level. In 1969, she won the title of Miss Utah.

In 1972-73, Bloom was featured on The Dean Martin Show in the second edition of the Dingaling Sisters.

In 1975, Bloom was cast in the lead role of an American International Pictures drive-in theatre fare, Sixpack Annie, about a "beer-guzzling, truck-driving Southern belle," in a scanty wardrobe. "Some of the language I use is pretty salty," she said. "That and the nude scene is why they gave it an 'R' rating." She played the lovely switchboard operator, Maybelle, on frequent episodes of The Dukes of Hazzard. She also had roles in Cover Girl Models (1975), Hughes and Harlow: Angels in Hell (playing Jean Harlow) (1978), French Quarter (1978), The Main Event (1979), H.O.T.S. (1979) and The Happy Hooker Goes Hollywood (1980).

Bloom was cast as detective Mike Hammer's secretary Velda in Mickey Spillane's Mike Hammer and The New Mike Hammer. In 1985, she appeared in the NBC television film Bridge Across Time. In 1986, she appeared opposite Barry Jenner, Jamie Farr, Tom Poston, Paul Eiding, James Widdoes, and Jack Carter in 1987 on Super Password which was hosted by Bert Convy.

References

External links

American film actresses
American television actresses
Living people
Actresses from Omaha, Nebraska
American beauty pageant winners
Miss International 1972 delegates
21st-century American women
Year of birth missing (living people)